SNEL may refer to:

Sasken Network Engineering Limited, a wholly owned subsidiary of Sasken Communication Technologies
Société nationale d'électricité, the national electricity company of the Democratic Republic of the Congo

See also
 Snel, a Dutch surname